"God's Will" is a song written by Barry Dean and Tom Douglas and recorded by American country music artist Martina McBride.  It was released in December 2004 as the fourth and final single from McBride's 2003 album Martina.

Music video
The music video was directed by Deaton-Flanigen Productions and premiered in late 2004. It was nominated for a Grammy Award for Best Short Form Music Video.

Synopsis
The video starts with McBride sitting on a pew bench in the park with autumn leaves blowing in the wind. She starts singing and thinks back to a Halloween night when she met Will, a young, crippled boy who came trick-or-treating dressed as a bag of leaves. Later, it shows McBride and her daughter babysitting Will and playing a board game while his mother worked late. Later, McBride sees Will and his mom playing tee ball in their yard. Will and his mom eventually move away and before he gets into his car he gives McBride a drawing of him and her holding hands with the words "Me and God love you" written in crayon and she waves goodbye to him. The video ends with McBride sitting on the pew bench in the park, holding Will's drawing lovingly to her chest, and going to play with her daughter.

Chart performance
"God's Will" debuted at number 56 on the U.S. Billboard Hot Country Songs chart for the week of December 4, 2004.

References

2004 singles
Martina McBride songs
Songs written by Tom Douglas (songwriter)
Song recordings produced by Paul Worley
RCA Records Nashville singles
Music videos directed by Deaton-Flanigen Productions
Songs written by Barry Dean (songwriter)
2003 songs